Natacha Lindinger (born 20 February 1970) is a French actress. She has appeared in more than sixty films since 1991.

Selected filmography

Film

Television

References

External links

1970 births
Living people
French film actresses